AAB College is a private university in Pristina, Kosovo. It was founded in 2000 as an institution of higher education in mass communication. In 2008, it had expanded to eight departments.

Notes

External links 
 

Educational institutions established in 2000
2000s establishments in Kosovo
Universities in Kosovo